Semen Denshchikov (born 10 April 1993) is a Russian freestyle skier. He competed in the 2018 Winter Olympics.

References

1993 births
Living people
Freestyle skiers at the 2018 Winter Olympics
Russian male freestyle skiers
Olympic freestyle skiers of Russia